Aubach is a river of Bavaria, Germany. It is a right tributary of the Lohr in Partenstein.

See also
List of rivers of Bavaria

References

Rivers of Bavaria
Rivers of the Spessart
Rivers of Germany